Otto Donald Rogers  (19 November 1935 – 28 April 2019) was a Canadian painter and sculptor from rural Saskatchewan whose abstract works reflects his belief as a member of the Baháʼí Faith in unity in diversity. His work has been widely exhibited. It is held in many private and public collections in Canada and other countries.

Early years

Otto Donald Rogers was born on 19 December 1935 in Kerrobert, Saskatchewan.
He grew up on a farm near Kelfield, Saskatchewan. 
He took an art class with Wynona Mulcaster, who was impressed by his talent and encouraged Rogers to pursue a career in art.
Mulcaster introduced him to cubism, a style he was to adopt for himself.
Rogers attended the University of Wisconsin–Madison from 1954 to 1959.
In 1955 he obtained a scholarship from the Saskatchewan Arts Board that let him attend the Emma Lake Artist's Workshop led by Jack Shadbolt.
He obtained a BSc in Art Education in 1958 and an MSc in Fine Art in 1959.

Later career

After graduating from university Rogers spent a few months in New York City.
He then joined the faculty of the arts department of the University of Saskatchewan, where he taught from 1959 to 1988.
His student Robert Christie remembers Rogers as a charismatic teacher.
He and the structurist Eli Bornstein dominated the department.
Another student said he was "a fantastic mentor, a task master with very high standards."
He helped rejuvenate the Emma Lake Artist's Workshops between 1971 and 1987.
In the early 1970s Rogers spent three months working in Iceland.
In 1973 he became a member of the Royal Canadian Academy of Arts.
From 1973 to 1978 Rogers was head of the university's art department.
The sculptor Anthony Caro asked Rogers to participate in his Triangle workshop in New York in 1984, and in a second Triangle workshop in Barcelona in 1987. 
The Barcelona Museum of Contemporary Art purchased three of Rogers' sculptural reliefs.

In 1959 Rogers married Barbara Nelson, who brought him to the Baháʼí Faith.
He became a member of the Canadian Baháʼí community in 1960.
Rogers became a leader in Baháʼí activities in Saskatchewan, and held increasingly senior positions in the organization of this religion.
In 1988 Rogers left the University of Saskatchewan and moved to Haifa, Israel, where for ten years he was a Counselor member of the International Teaching Centre at the Baháʼí World Centre.
While based in Israel he visited Russia and met previously banned abstract artists. He was conducted through the vaults of the Hermitage in Saint Petersburg, where he saw the works of artists such as Wassily Kandinsky and Kazimir Malevich.

In 1998 Rogers returned to Canada and settled in Milford in Prince Edward County, Ontario.
His studio there was designed by his son-in-law Siamak Hariri, an architect, who is married to his daughter Sasha Rogers.
She is also a painter.

The passing of Donald Rogers was announced to the Baháʼí community on April 28, 2019.

Work

Rogers follows the Cubist-Constructivist tradition started by Pablo Picasso, Julio González and David Smith.
His early work included portraits, still lifes, landscapes and cityscapes. Later his work became increasingly abstract.
He has worked in different media that range from color-field painting to assembled steel sculpture.
His paintings show the influence of the prairie spaces and of his Baháʼí beliefs.
Both his faith and his art reflect the central belief of unity in diversity.
Clement Greenberg said of the Otto Rogers when he was a young man, that he is “an artist of amazing talent, worthy of an international reputation.”
He has been given many awards for his painting, sculpture and graphic arts.
Rogers' work is held in public and private collections in several countries.
These include:

 Art Gallery of Ontario, Toronto, Canada
 MacKenzie Art Gallery, Regina, Canada
 Mendel Art Gallery, Saskatoon, Canada
 Montreal Museum of Fine Arts, Montreal, Canada
 Musée national des beaux-arts du Québec, Quebec City, Canada
 Museum of Contemporary Art, Barcelona, Spain
 Museum of Fine Arts, Boston, U.S.
 National Gallery of Canada, Ottawa, Canada
 National Gallery of Iceland, Reykjavík, Iceland
 Bank of Montreal, Canada
 General Foods, Canada
 Scotiabank, Canada

References

Sources

Further reading

1935 births
2019 deaths
20th-century Canadian painters
20th-century Canadian sculptors
Canadian male sculptors
Canadian abstract artists
Artists from Saskatchewan
Members of the Royal Canadian Academy of Arts
Academic staff of the University of Saskatchewan
Canadian male painters